Anastasios 'Tasos' Avlonitis (born 1 January 1990) is a Greek professional footballer who plays as a centre-back for Super League 2 club Panserraikos.

Club career

Early career

Avlonitis started as an amateur in his hometown team Chalkineo Evias in which he played in the local league. In 2007, he was signed to Egaleo, which for three  seasons played in Football League. In the 2008–09 season he was loaned to Ilisiakos. In 2010, he signed to Kavala, where he played the 2010–11 season. After the involvement of the club President Psomiadis in a match-fixing scandal, Avlonitis was released and signed a contract with Panionios.

Olympiacos

In July 2014, Olympiacos announced the transfer of Avlonitis from former club Panionios for a fee of around €670,000. On his first derby game against Panathinaikos, on 26 October 2014, Avlonitis scored the winning goal for Olympiacos, as they beat Panathinaikos 1–0 at home. His next goal came against Panthrakikos in a 5–1 home win. On 30 January 2015, the Austrian club Sturm Graz have expressed an interest to sign Olympiacos defender on loan. The Greek defender is not in Marco Silva's plans and Sturm Graz are moving towards to clinch a loan deal until the end of the season. Eventually, the central defender will continue his career in Austria for Sturm Graz, on loan until the end of 2015–16 season. On 6 February 2016, he made his debut with the club in a 2–2 away draw against Altach.

On 1 September 2016, he mutually solved his contract with Olympiacos.

Heart of Midlothian
On 30 January 2017, Avlonitis signed for Scottish Premiership club, Heart of Midlothian on a six-month deal running until the end of the 2016–17 season. On 22 May 2017, Avlonitis was released by the club, following the end of the Premiership season.

Panathinaikos
On 11 September 2017, Avlonitis signed a two years contract with Superleague club Panathinaikos for an undisclosed fee.
In the first half of the 2016–17 season, the central defender was bright in for defensive cover and has found first team minutes hard to come by since arriving but when called upon he has demonstrated he can be trusted. Given his lack of playing time it is hard to judge but he is expected to feature more often in the second half of the season after the probable departure of Rodrigo Moledo.

Sturm Graz
In April 2018, Avlonitis signed a two-year contract with his former club Sturm Graz, in which he played on loan from Olympiacos in the second half of the 2015–16 season. He had previously terminated his contract with Panathinaikos at his own request. On 9 August 2018, he played his first international game as a starter in a 2–0 home loss for UEFA Europa League Third qualifying round, 1st leg game against AEK Larnaca. On 21 September 2019, he scored his first goal with the club with a kick after a Kiril Despodov's corner in an away 3–3 draw against SV Mattersburg. The Greek defender, who has been irreplaceable this season in Sturm Graz's backline, produced a cheeky back-heel assist to register his second assist of the season. As a result of his excellent form, was included in the Best XI for matchday 18 in the Austrian Football Bundesliga. On 28 December 2019, Sturm Graz revealed their Team of the Decade, with Avlonitis and Charalampos Lykogiannis both included in the starting 11.

Ascoli
On 21 September 2020, he joined Italian club Ascoli on a 2-year contract.

Apollon Limassol
On 27 January 2022, he signed a 1.5-year contract with Apollon Limassol in Cyprus.

Panserraikos
In January 2023, Avlonitis signed for Panserraikos to help the team return to the Superleague.

International career
He was also a former Greece under-19 and Greece under-21 international.

Career statistics

Honours
Olympiacos
Super League Greece: 2014–15
Greek Cup: 2014–15
Apollon Limassol
Cypriot First Division: 2021–22

Individual
Austrian Bundesliga Team of the Year: 2019–20

References

External links
 

1990 births
Living people
Greek footballers
Greece youth international footballers
Egaleo F.C. players
Ilisiakos F.C. players
Kavala F.C. players
Panionios F.C. players
Olympiacos F.C. players
Heart of Midlothian F.C. players
SK Sturm Graz players
Ascoli Calcio 1898 F.C. players
Apollon Limassol FC players
Panserraikos F.C. players
Super League Greece players
Scottish Professional Football League players
Austrian Football Bundesliga players
Serie B players
Footballers from Chalcis
Association football central defenders
Greek expatriate footballers
Expatriate footballers in Scotland
Greek expatriate sportspeople in Scotland
Expatriate footballers in Austria
Greek expatriate sportspeople in Austria
Expatriate footballers in Italy
Greek expatriate sportspeople in Italy
Expatriate footballers in Cyprus
Greek expatriate sportspeople in Cyprus